The 1993–94 Nationale 1 season was the 73rd season of the Nationale 1, the top level of ice hockey in France. 16 teams participated in the league, and the Dragons de Rouen won their fourth league title.

First round

Group A

Group B

Group C

Group D

Second round

N1B

N1A

Third round

13th-16th place

9th-12th place

5th-8th place round

Final round

Playoffs

External links
Season on hockeyarchives.info

France
1993–94 in French ice hockey
Ligue Magnus seasons